New York's 107th State Assembly district is one of the 150 districts in the New York State Assembly. It has been represented by Republican Scott Bendett since 2023, succeeding Jake Ashby.

Geography
District 107 consists of a majority of Rennselaer County and portions of Albany, Washington and Columbia counties.

2010s 
District 107 consists of a majority of Rennselaer County (except for the city of Rensselaer) and portions of Washington and Columbia counties.

Recent election results

2022

2020

2018

2018 special

2016

2014

2012

References

107
Rensselaer County, New York
Washington County, New York
Columbia County, New York